Cité Mémoire is an ongoing art installation created by Michel Lemieux and Victor Pilon, displayed in Old Montreal, Quebec, Canada. It is scheduled to last for four years, and features 80 projectors creating images on old buildings. Cité Mémoire has been called the "largest such installation in the world".  On the days when the projection is active, which varies during the year, it is available from dusk to close to the end of the day.

References

Public art in Montreal
Old Montreal